Synnøve Liaaen Jensen (1 March 1932 – 22 April 2022) was a Norwegian chemist.

She took the  degree in 1963 as the first woman in Norway, and became the first female professor at the Norwegian Institute of Technology. She was a professor of theoretical chemistry there from 1970 to her retirement. She also received an honorary degree at the University of Zurich in 1986. She was a fellow of the Norwegian Academy of Science and Letters and the Norwegian Academy of Technological Sciences.

References

1932 births
2022 deaths
Norwegian chemists
Norwegian Institute of Technology alumni
Academic staff of the Norwegian Institute of Technology
Academic staff of the Norwegian University of Science and Technology
Members of the Norwegian Academy of Science and Letters
Members of the Norwegian Academy of Technological Sciences